Children on Their Birthdays is a 2002 American independent drama film directed by Mark Medoff, and starring Sheryl Lee, Jesse Plemons, Joe Pichler, Tania Raymonde, Christopher McDonald, and Tom Arnold. The screenplay written by Douglas Sloan is based on "Children on Their Birthdays", the short story of the same title by Truman Capote. This was the last film appearance by Pichler before his disappearance in 2006.

Plot
In the summer of 1947, a pretentious thirteen-year-old girl called "Miss" Lily Jane Bobbit is liked by two boys, who are best friends. Using the funniest vocabulary and the ever so heavy accent, she manages to win the attraction of the town's people, including the love of the two best friends. As the story continues, it must be decided as to whether or not the two boys will remain best friends, as only one of them can win Miss Bobbit's heart.

Production
The film was shot in Aurora, Lemont and Chicago, Illinois.

Critical reception
Children on Their Birthdays won the Platinum Award for Independent Theatrical Feature Films - Family/Children at WorldFest Houston.

External links

Reference list

Artisan Entertainment films
Films based on short fiction
2002 films
2002 drama films
Films set in 1947
Films shot in Illinois
Plaion
Films based on works by Truman Capote
2000s English-language films